The Dominican myotis (Myotis dominicensis) is a species of vesper bat. It is found in Dominica and Guadeloupe.

References

Mouse-eared bats
Taxonomy articles created by Polbot
Taxa named by Gerrit Smith Miller Jr.
Bats of the Caribbean
Mammals described in 1902